Barkley Shut Up and Jam 2 is a 1995 basketball video game developed and published by Accolade exclusively for the Sega Genesis. The game is a sequel to 1994's Barkley Shut Up and Jam!

Piko Interactive acquired the rights to the game and re-released it in a compilation cartridge for the Evercade handheld under the name Hoops Shut Up and Jam 2 in 2021.

Gameplay

The game is played from a horizontal perspective as the player and its teammate (computer or human) try to outscore the competition using any means necessary.

Players can choose from ten "streetwise" players, not including Charles Barkley himself, as they play in either an exhibition game or tournament. Since this is basketball on the street, players compete in eight different urban environments featuring graffiti, rubble, and even a moving train. More than 2000 player animations have been included to show moves such as behind-the-back passes, double-clutches, alley-oops, and 25 different dunks. Battery backup allows players to save tournament progress, as well as individual records such as triple doubles, total wins, and total losses.

In addition, digitized voice samples of Charles Barkley offer either words of encouragement or ridicule while they play.

Reception
GamePro gave the game a mixed review, saying that the graphics and animations are drastically improved over the original Barkley, the tournament mode is "a worthy challenge for veteran b-ball gamers", and the gameplay is complex, but that "the action stays at relatively the same pace throughout the game" and in single player mode the computer partner AI often fails to cooperate with the player's attempts at teamwork. A reviewer for Next Generation said that while the game is "far superior" to the original Barkley, it is still terrible in absolute terms; the only elaboration he gave is that "it just doesn't capture basketball of streetball particularly well." He gave it one out of five stars.

References

External links
Barkley Shut Up and Jam 2 at MobyGames

1995 video games
Accolade (company) games
Basketball video games
Cultural depictions of American men
Cultural depictions of basketball players
North America-exclusive video games
Sega Genesis games
Sega Genesis-only games
Video game sequels
Video games developed in the United States
Multiplayer and single-player video games
Video games based on real people
Video games featuring black protagonists